Nanxiang Bun Shop is a traditional Shanghai eatery located in the City God Temple precinct in the old Chinese section of the city. It was established in 1900. Nanxiang is a town near Shanghai where the xiaolong mantou was invented.  The restaurant has more recently expanded internationally, with branches in South Korea and Japan.

History
Established in 1900, the store traces its origins to Nanxiang, Jiading District of Shanghai. Its main restaurant is now located in the City God Temple area of Shanghai. After 1949, the restaurant was confiscated by the Communist government of China, and remains owned by a government-owned company.

See also
Baozi
Din Tai Fung
Shanghainese cuisine

References

External links
 

Restaurants in Shanghai
Chinese restaurants